Darren Carabott (born 13 January 1994) is a Maltese politician serving as a Member of Parliament and as the President of Public Accounts Committee in the Parliament of Malta since March 2022.

Carabott was first elected to as a Member of the Parliament of Malta since his election in 2022, in which he successfully contested the First Electoral District in Malta as a candidate for the Partit Nazzjonalista.

Family and personal life 
Darren Carabott was born on 13 January 1994 in Pietà, and he grew up with his parents Jeffrey and Marthese and his older brother Karl in Santa Venera. He studied at St Augustine's College in Pietà, Ġ.F. Abela Junior College, and he graduated in law from the University of Malta in 2018. In 2019, Darren Carabott obtained his warrant to practice law in Malta.

In 2019, Carabott furthered his academic studies by reading for a Master of Laws in Transnational Crime & Justice, an international criminal and human rights law based programme in Turin (Italy) jointly organised by the United Nations mandated University for Peace (UPEACE), and the United Nations Interregional Crime & Justice Research Institute (UNICRI).

In his student years, Darren Carabott was quite active and occupied numerous roles in a local student organisation SDM (Studenti Demokristjani Maltin) and also got involved in Partit Nazzjonalista's youth wing MŻPN (Moviment Żgħażagħ Partit Nazzjonalista).

At the age of 16, Carabott also got involved in local politics where he joined the Partit Nazzjonalista local committee in Santa Venera. Carabott held the post of President for a number of years before submitting his resignation in order to contest the Maltese general elections.

During his student years, Carabott was also a journalist and newscaster for Net News, a local media station.

Political career

Local Councillor 
On 17 April 2013, Carabott successfully contested the casual election to fill the vacated seat of Ronald Briffa in the Local Council Elections for his hometown of Santa Venera, becoming Malta's youngest elected Local Councillor at the time.

Six years later, on 25 May 2019, Carabott was re-elected in the Santa Venera Local Council after obtaining the most votes from the contesting candidates. He served his second term as Minority Leader as Partit Nazzjonalista did not manage to obtain the majority of seats in the Santa Venera Local Council.

After nine years, Carabott resigned from the Santa Venera Local Council after getting elected to Parliament in 2022.

Member of Parliament 
On 26 March 2022, Carabott successfully contested the general elections on the First Electoral District, comprising Valletta, Hamrun, Marsa, Pietà, Guardamangia and Santa Venera.

Currently, Carabott is the Opposition's spokesperson for Public Administration and Local Governance. In addition to these roles, he is also the President of the Public Accounts Committee and is a member of the National Audit Office Accounts Committee.

In August 2022, Carabott was elected to the Commonwealth Association for Public Accounts Committees (CAPAC)

See also 

 List of members of the parliament of Malta, 2022–2027

References 

Living people
Place of birth missing (living people)
21st-century Maltese politicians
Members of the House of Representatives of Malta
Nationalist Party (Malta) politicians
1994 births